Séga Coulibaly (born 9 June 1996) is a professional footballer who plays for LA Galaxy as a defender. Born in Mali, he has previously represented the France under-20 national team.

Club career

Rennes
Coulibaly is a youth product of Stade Rennais F.C. He signed his first professional contract with Rennes on 13 July 2016.

On 2 August 2016, Coulibaly signed a one-year loan deal with CS Sedan Ardennes. He made his professional debut with Sedan on 5 August 2016 at US Avranches in the Championnat National. He played the whole match in a 1–1 draw.

In January 2018, Coulibaly joined US Avranches on loan for the remainder of the 2018–19 season, becoming an "essential" element of the team's survival in the 2018–19 Championnat National, according to coach Damien Ott.

Nancy
On 13 June 2018, Coulibaly signed a three-year contract with Ligue 2 side Nancy.

In September 2019, Coulibaly again joined US Avranches on loan.

LA Galaxy
On 28 April 2021, Coulibaly signed a two-year deal with MLS side LA Galaxy. With his contract expiring that summer, LA Galaxy paid a nominal transfer fee to secure his arrival before the summer transfer window.

Career statistics

Club

References

External links
 
 

1996 births
Living people
Sportspeople from Bamako
Association football defenders
French footballers
France youth international footballers
Malian footballers
French sportspeople of Malian descent
Championnat National players
Ligue 2 players
Stade Rennais F.C. players
CS Sedan Ardennes players
US Avranches players
AS Nancy Lorraine players
LA Galaxy players
French expatriate footballers
Expatriate soccer players in the United States
French expatriate sportspeople in the United States
Major League Soccer players